Peter Seabourne (born 1960) is an English contemporary classical composer based in Lincolnshire, England.

Biography
Seabourne studied at Clare College, Cambridge with Robin Holloway, and University of York with David Blake.

In 1984 he was joint winner of the Overseas League Composition Competition, and was second in the Benjamin Britten Prize in 1986. In his student years works were performed in the Camden, York, Huddersfield, Cambridge and Devizes Festivals and three times in the Purcell Room on London's South Bank, by Lontano], Tapestry, Endymion (ensemble) and others.

Around 1989 he abandoned composition, feeling a growing separation with the new music world, and doubting his technique and voice. He remained silent for some 12 years and rejected all his work to date.

In 2001 he resumed composition, rapidly creating a large number of pieces. Since this time he has been awarded several times in international competitions. In 2004 his 1st Piano Concerto won 3rd Prize and joint-orchestra prize in the 1st International Uuno Klami Composition Competition in Finland. In the same year he took 3rd prize in the Ivan Spassov competition in Bulgaria with Soaring. In 2005 his song cycle Sappho Songs was highly commended in the IMRO International Competition in Ireland, and the following year his Soaring took 1st prize. Also in 2006 his septet My River was selected by North/South Consonance Ensemble from over two hundred scores and performed in New York City.

Seabourne's catalogue includes six symphonies, seven concerti and ten large piano cycles called Steps. His work has been commissioned by the Rio International 'Cello Festival (On the blue shore of silence 2007), Rheinische Philharmonie/Daniel Raiskin (Tu Sospiri? 2010), Paul Klee Zentrum/Kaspar Zehnder (Storyteller for solo double bass and ensemble 2011), Moravská Filharmonie/Ondrej Vrabec (Double Concerto for Horn and Orchestra 2011), Coull Quartet (Accept these few roses 2011), Vestfold Festival/Henning Kraggerud, Spalding Flower Festival (Mille Fiori for four trumpets 2011), Norfolk Concerts and Douglas Gowan (String Quintet 2012), Deutsche Kammerakademie Neuss am Rhein (Violin Concerto 2016) and Musica Nova Reutlingen (Freeing the Angel – viola/piano 2019).

Seabourne's work has been broadcast in Norway, Czech Republic, Finland, Germany, Switzerland, Estonia, Portugal, Israel, Norway and United States. It has been played in many European countries, the Americas, China and in Armenia.

The Italian label Sheva Collection has issued thirteen CDs of the composer's work. Six have been reviewed in Gramophone Magazine, BBC Music Magazine, The Strad, Musical Opinion in the UK, and elsewhere. Further works are included on SIMAX  (Norway), Da Vinci (Japan), Sheva Collection (Italy) and Willowhayne Records (UK).
His catalogue includes six symphonies, seven concertos, other symphonic and chamber works, song cycles and an ongoing, large-scale piano cycle series called Steps (ten volumes).

Compositional style
Seabourne's work has roots in the neo-Romantic tradition, with influences from Janáček, Mahler, Ravel, Prokofiev, Sibelius, Carl Nielsen and Robin Holloway. However his musical language is distinctively idiosyncratic, with its own modernity. It is particularly "inventive with regard to rhythm" and hovers on the edge of tonality.

List of works

Orchestral:
The Darkness of Ages – poem for orchestra 12mins – 2001 rev.2009
Piano Concerto no.1 – dur. 28mins – 2004 rev. 2006
Scherzo Serioso – dur. 10mins – 2005 (also as arrangement for 2 pianos 2014)
Piano Concerto no.2 – dur. 25 mins – 2006 (première Kristina Stepasjuková, piano, with Ondřej Vrabec and the Academy Orchestra of the Czech Philharmonic March 2016)
Tu Sospiri? – dur. 13mins – 2010
Double Concerto for Horn and Orchestra – dur. 23mins – 2011
Cor Anglais Concerto – dur. 26mins – 2013
Symphony of Roses – dur. 32mins – 2014 (première Biel-Bienne May 2016 Sinfonie Orchester Biel Solothurn conducted by Kaspar Zehnder)
Symphony no.2 – dur. 45mins – 2014
Symphony no.3 – dur. 33mins – 2016
Violin Concerto – solo violin and strings – dur 30mins – 2003–2016
Symphony no.4 – dur. 33mins – 2017
Piano Concerto no.3 – dur. 27mins – 2018
Viola Concerto – dur. 30mins – 2020
Symphony no.5 - Sea of Life – dur. 18½mins – 2021
Bitten! - Tarantella for orchestra – dur. 6mins – 2022
Symphony no.6 – dur. 24mins – 2022

Chamber/ensemble:
A music beginning – violin/piano 11mins. 2001 (première Stamford International Chamber Music Festival 2005 – Andrew Smith/Wayman Chin)
The Sadness of the King – septet (clt. bsn. hrn. 2vln. vla. pno) dur. 13mins – 2002
Child’s Play... – wind quintet – dur. 30mins – 2003 and 2006
(one movement also arranged as scherzo for octet (clt. bsn. hrn. 2vln. vla. vc. cb) and for chamber orchestra dur. 5mins)
Soaring – oboe and piano (also as an arrangement for oboe and string quartet) – dur. 12 mins – 2003 (première Arklow Festival – Chris Redgate/Mary Dullea 2006), (2nd movement première Naomi Ozawa, Pam Yan Los Angeles 2014)
accept these few roses... – string quartet – 10mins – 2005/2011
My River – (flt. ob. clt. vln. vla. vc. pno.) – 10mins – 2005
Autumnal Dances – clarinet and piano – dur. 17mins
Pietà – viola and piano – dur. 29mins – 2007
On the blue shore of silence – ‘cello and piano – dur. 23mins – 2007
Adrift! (Chamber Concerto no.1)  – dectet (flt/picc. ob. clt. bsn. hrn. 2vln. vla. vc. cb.) – dur. 16mins – 2008
Phantasy Caprices (Chamber Concerto no.2) – dectet (flt. ob. clt. bsn. hrn. vln. vla. vc. cb. pno.) – dur. 18mins – 2009
Last Dance – piano trio – dur. 7mins – 2010 (première Philharmonic Hall, Lviv 2010 – Ostap and Olga Shutko, Myroslav Dragan).  Also played in King's Lynn Festival, UK
Storyteller (Chamber Concerto no.3) – solo double bass with fl. ob. clt. bsn. hrn. vln. vc. pno – dur. 12mins – 2010
A Portrait and Four Nocturnes – violin and piano – dur. 19mins – 2010
String Quintet – 2 vlns, vla, 2 vc – dur. 25mins – 2011 
Sonata Appassionata – violin and ’cello – dur. 21mins – 2012
The Black Pegasus – rhapsody – horn and piano – dur. 13mins – 2018
Piano Trio – violin, 'cello and piano – dur. 24mins – 2018
Encounters – five short duets for two horns – dur. 8mins – 2019
Freeing the Angel – viola and piano – dur. 7mins – 2019
Gran Partita – wind octet (2 oboes, 2 clarinets, 2 horns, 2 bassoons) – dur. 30mins – 2019
Fall – horn and string quartet – dur. 22mins – 2020

Solo:

Steps volume 1: 12 collected pieces for piano – dur. c85 mins – 2001-6 
Steps volume 2: Studies of Invention – piano – dur. 48mins – 2006-7
Steps Volume 3: Arabesques – piano – dur.35mins – 2008–12 (première Clothworkers Hall, Leeds 2014)
Steps volume 4: Libro di Canti Italiano – piano – dur. 50mins – 2009–2011
Steps volume 5: Sixteen Scenes before a Crucifixion – piano – dur. 50mins – 2013–14
Steps volume 6: Toccatas and Fantasias – piano – dur. 50mins – 2016–17
Steps volume 7: Dances on the Head of a Pin – piano – dur. 49mins – 2018–19
Steps volume 8: My Song in October – piano – dur. 46mins – 2020–21
Steps volume 9: Les Fleurs de la Maladie – piano – dur. 50mins – 2020–21
Persephone – harp – 4 mins – 2004
Møte – solo violin – dur. 5 mins – 2010
Threads – solo violin – dur. 18 mins – 2017
Julie Dances – solo horn – dur. 9 minutes – 2020
Going – solo horn – dur. 2mins – 2020
then -  – solo viola – dur. 5mins – 2020

Song and vocal: 
September, Just Septembers – 9 settings of Emily Dickinson (soprano and piano) dur. 18mins – 2002
Sappho Songs – 4 settings of Sappho in French Translations by Renée Vivien (soprano and piano) dur. 8mins −2002
Moon Beyond the White Clouds – 4 settings of classical Chinese texts in English (soprano and piano) dur. 8mins – 2003
The Garden in the Brain – 7 Songs to words of Emily Dickinson (soprano and piano) – dur. 13 mins – 2003 (also exists in an instrumental version for alto sax and piano)
There was a Maid – carol for SATB + organ – 4 minutes – Commissioned by Repton School, Derbyshire – 2003
Sea Song – 6-word opera (sop. bar. clt. vc. sus-cym. pno) – dur. 2 mins
Sonnets to Orpheus – Eleven settings of Rainer Maria Rilke (mezzo-soprano and piano) – dur. 35mins – 2013
Orpheus. Eurydike. Hermes. – scena setting Rainer Maria Rilke (mezzo-soprano and chamber orchestra) – dur. 28mins – 2004–2016
Called Back – 10 settings of Emily Dickinson (soprano and piano) – dur. 20 mins – 2022

RecordingsSteps Volume 1: An Anthology for Piano – Minjeong Shin, piano – Sheva Contemporary SH168 (review in The Classical Reviewer)Steps Volume 2: Studies of Invention – Giovanni Santini, piano – Sheva Contemporary SH065 (reviews in Music-Web international 2013,Gramophone 2013)Steps Volume 3: Arabesques – Michael Bell, piano – Sheva Contemporary SH088 (review in Gramophone 2013)Steps Volume 4: Libro di Canti Italiano – Fabio Menchetti, piano – Sheva Contemporary SH104 (review in Gramophone)Steps Volume 5: Sixteen Scenes Before a Crucifixion Alessandro Viale piano – Sheva Contemporary SH136 (reviews in Gramophone and The Classical Reviewer)Sonata Appassionata; A music beginning; On the blue shore of silence – Ostap Shutko, violin; Olga Shutko, 'cello; Myroslav Dragan, piano – Sheva Contemporary SH082This is a song for you alone (later revised and expanded, becoming Violin Concerto) – Irina Borissova, violin, with Mainzer Virtuosi, conductor Dmitry Khakhalin – SH091 (review in Gramophone 2015)Møte (Meeting) from The Munch Suite – Henning Kraggerud, violin – SIMAX(review in The Independent) Pietà – Georg Hamann, viola, and Akari Komiya, piano – Sheva Contemporary SH137 VIOLA DOLOROSA (reviews in The Strad 2015 The Classical Reviewer)Threads – Alberto Bologni, violin – Sheva Contemporary SH184 (review in Art Music Lounge)The Garden in the Brain (arrangement of song cycle) – Valentina Renesto, alto saxophone, and Giuseppe Bruno, piano – Da Vinci C00174A Portrait and Four Nocturnes – Irina Borissova, violin, and Giacomo Battarino, piano – Sheva Contemporary SH226 (review in Limelight)Mille Fiori, Encounters, The Black Pegasus, Julie Dances – British Music for horn – Ondřej Vrabec, horn – Sheva Contemporary SH241 (reviews in Gramophone, Limelight, BBC Music Magazine)Piano Trio – Moments of Vision – Avant Trio (Rebecca Raimondi, violin - Urška Horvat, cello - Alessandro Viale, piano) – Sheva Contemporary SH271 (review in Limelight)Trois Petits Adieux – Michael Bell, piano – Sheva Contemporary SH275Fall - Horn Quintets – Ondřej Vrabec, horn; Pavel Bořkovec Quartet – Sheva Contemporary SH281 (reviews in Gramophone, BBC Music Magazine,Limelight, Klassik Musikk)Møte – Diversity in Unity – Liza Fediukova, violin – Sheva Collection SH292Steps Volume 6: Toccatas and Fantasias'' – Konstantin Lifschitz, piano – Willowhayne Records WHR073CD

References

External links
Composer's official website
Sheva Collection CD label – Italy
Simax CD label – Norway
Gramophone Magazine
The Strad
The Classical Reviewer

Living people
1960 births
English male classical composers
Musicians from Lincolnshire
20th-century classical composers
English classical composers
20th-century English musicians
20th-century British composers
20th-century British male musicians